Nina Vujičić (born 20 December 1997) is a Montenegrin footballer who plays as a midfielder. She has been a member of the Montenegro women's national team.

References

1997 births
Living people
Montenegrin women's footballers
Women's association football midfielders
ŽFK Ekonomist players
ŽFK Breznica players
Montenegro women's international footballers